Felimida grahami is a species of colourful sea slug, a dorid nudibranch, a marine gastropod mollusc in the family Chromodorididae.

Taxonomic history
This species should be transferred to Felimida according to Johnson & Gosliner (2012). 
‘Felimida’ Marcus, 1971 [86].
Type species: Felimida sphoni Marcus, 1971 [86] (by monotypy)
This name will be used for all eastern Pacific and Atlantic species of Chromodoris and Glossodoris (except Glossodoris sedna). These species form a polytomy including Glossodoris baumanni and three clades of Atlantic and Eastern Pacific chromodorids.
Chromodoris clenchi, C. norrisi and C. sphoni (pp = 1.00)
Glossodoris dalli and G. edmundsi (pp = 1.00)
Chromodoris krohni, C. luteorosea and C. purpurea (pp = 0.78)
These exclusively eastern Pacific and Atlantic clades do not form a monophyletic group, but we will provisionally name all of these species ‘Felimida’. This is the most conservative choice, the choice that requires the fewest name changes and is the least disruptive pending further information and broader taxon sampling.

Distribution
This species was described from Jamaica. It has been reported from Colombia.

Description 
The maximum recorded length is 20 mm.

Habitat 
Minimum recorded depth is 1 m. Maximum recorded depth is 5 m.

References

Chromodorididae
Gastropods described in 1980